Hormurus boholiensis is a species of scorpion in the Hormuridae family. It is endemic to the Philippines. It was first described in 1914 by German naturalist Karl Kraepelin.

References

 

 
boholiensis
Arthropods of the Philippines
Taxa named by Karl Kraepelin
Animals described in 1914